Statistics of the 1967 Cameroonian Premier League season.

Overview
Oryx Douala won the championship.

References
Cameroon - List of final tables (RSSSF)

1967 in Cameroonian football
Cam
Cam
Elite One seasons